

The LIPNUR Kolentang was an Indonesian autogyro based on a Bensen design.

References
 
 Harapan dan Tanggapan Pemerhati dan Mitra

Aircraft manufactured in Indonesia
Autogyros